RBC may refer to:

Media and arts
 RBK Daily, a general business newspaper published in Moscow, Russia.
 RBK Group, a large Russian media group
 RBC Ministries, now Our Daily Bread Ministries, a Christian media outlet in Grand Rapdis, Michigan
 RBC Radio, the former name of Easy 96, a sub-channel radio station providing Asian Indian programming in New York City
 RBC Records, an American independent record label
 RBC Theatre, in the Living Arts Centre, Mississauga, Ontario, Canada
 RBK TV, a business news channel in Russia
 Regional Broadband Consortium, a UK entity for development of broadband to schools
 Rhodesian Broadcasting Corporation, now the Zimbabwe Broadcasting Corporation
 Ryukyu Broadcasting Corporation, a Japanese television and radio station
 Radio Beijing Corporation, a family of municipal radio stations in Beijing, China

Computing
 Real business-cycle theory, a class of classical macroeconomics models
 Recognition-by-components theory, a bottom-up process to explain object recognition
 Reflected binary code or Gray code, a binary numeral system where two successive values differ in only one bit
 Role-based collaboration, a computer programming approach in security and service software
 Radio Block Centre, a computer system of the European Train Control System

Companies and organizations
 RBC Roosendaal, a Dutch football club
 Rare Breeds Canada, dedicated to preserving Canadian livestock
 Royal Bank of Canada
RBC Bank, the US division of the Royal Bank of Canada
 Royal British Colonial Society of Artists
 Rwanda Biomedical Centre, the central health implementation agency in Rwanda

Schools
 Reformed Bible College, a former name of Kuyper College in Grand Rapids, Michigan, US
 Richard Bland College, in Virginia, US
 Roanoke Bible College, a previous name of Mid-Atlantic Christian University in Elizabeth City, North Carolina, US

Other uses
 Red blood cell, carries oxygen in the blood
 Robinvale Airport, in Robinvale, Victoria, Australia, by IATA code
 Rotating biological contactor, a biological process for wastewater treatment
 12e Régiment blindé du Canada, a Canadian Forces armored regiment in Valcartier, Quebec

See also
 RBC Plaza (disambiguation)